The Vaiphei people is an ethnic group who live in North-East Indian state of Manipur and its neighbouring country of Myanmar (Burma). Lt. Colonel J. Shakespeare (1887–1905), the first superintendent of the then Lushai Hills, referred to them as one of the Kuki clans of Manipur and recognized as part of the Chin-Kuki-Mizo tribe by the state government of Manipur. The group is originally from the Siyin valley located in the northern part of Chin State. The group speak the Vaiphei language.

References

Ethnic groups in Manipur
Social groups of India
Kuki tribes
Ethnic groups in Nepal
Ethnic groups in Myanmar